Drive 'N Drag is a tour featuring drag performers from the American television series RuPaul's Drag Race. Its shows are held at outdoor drive-in venues. The cast includes Aquaria, Bianca Del Rio, Kameron Michaels, Naomi Smalls, Plastique Tiara, and Violet Chachki. Later added were Season 13's Gottmik and Rosé.

Dates 

 February 19–20, Atlanta, GA
 February 23–24, Tampa, FL
 February 26–27, Fort Lauderdale, FL
 March 2–3, Houston, TX
 March 5–7, Austin, TX
 March 9–10, San Antonio, TX
 March 12–13, Dallas, TX
 March 16–17, Phoenix, AZ
 March 19–21, Los Angeles, CA
 April 21, live broadcast

References

2020 concert tours
Drag events
Impact of the COVID-19 pandemic on the LGBT community
RuPaul's Drag Race